Saint Seraphim Cathedral, is an Eastern Orthodox Cathedral located in the Oak Lawn neighborhood of Dallas, Texas. It is the episcopal seat of the Orthodox Church in America Diocese of the South, sharing its status with Christ the Saviour Cathedral in Miami Lakes, Florida. The Cathedral is named after St. Seraphim of Sarov.

History
The following is from a document entitled  “Some Historical Information Concerning St. Seraphim Eastern Orthodox Church” prepared by Dmitri Royster—sourced from pages 8-9 of Hearing Vol. 9 of the Warren Commission Report:

“In April 1954, a small group of converts to the Orthodox Faith (Rev.
Ilya Rudolph Rangel, rector of the already existing  Mexican Orthodox Church
under the jurisdiction of Bishop Bogdan (Spylka), Dmitri Royster, a subdeacon in Bishop Bogdan's jurisdiction, and Miss Dmitra Royster) sought permission
of their bishop to organize an English-language Orthodox mission in the city
of Dallas. It may be stated parenthetically that the three above-mentioned persons
were working, at the time of the organization of St. Seraphim's, in close
cooperation with ROCOR's St. Nicholas Russian Orthodox Church, of which Father Alexander
Chernay of Houston was pastor and which held services periodically in
the chapel of the Sunday School building at St. Matthew's Episcopal Cathedral.
Father Ilya and Subdeacon Dmitri set out to find a building that would
be suitable to house the activities of the projected mission. Property was located
at the corner of McKinney Avenue (3734) and Blackburn Street. The
sale price of the property was $15,000, and since the financial resources of the
organizers were limited. Father Ilya and Subdeacon Dmitri went to seek the
aid of Mr. Paul Raigorodsky, a member of St. Nicholas' Parish. Mr. Raigorodsky
agreed to make it possible for the group to acquire a loan from the
First National Bank in Dallas in order to purchase the property (on which
there was an eight-room two-story house). The property was bought in the
name of St. Seraphim's Church. Services in English began to be held in June 1954. 
Father Ilya conducted occasional services—Sunday Vespers weekly and an early Liturgy once
a month. Father Ilya and Subdeacon Dmitri constructed an iconostasis and
made a number of shrines and articles, and a chapel was arranged on the first
floor of the house. After a month or two the members of St. Nicholas' Parish
were invited to use the chapel, since one of their members had been so instrumental
in the acquisition of the property. On November 6, 1954, Subdeacon Dmitri was ordained to the priesthood by
Bishop Bogdan and became rector of St. Seraphim's Church (After Fr. Ilya departed from the Orthodox Church to the Baptist Church)

Shortly afterwards, it was agreed to transfer the title of the property at 3734 McKinney to
St. Nicholas' Church. It was further agreed that the two groups would use
the chapel, St. Nicholas' Church 1 weekend per month and St. Seraphim's Church
the rest of the time. In January 1955 an extensive renovation program was undertaken, and
both floors of the house were redecorated, sheet-rocked and painted.
Father Hilarion Madison had been ordained by Bishop Bogdan on October 31,
1954, and had worked with Father Ilya Rangel as assistant pastor at the Mexican
Church until December 1954, when he joined the work at St. Seraphim's and
became assistant to Father Dmitri. For a few months joint services were held on the occasions when Father
Alexander Chernay visited Dallas ; that is, Father Dimitri and Father Hilarion
concelebrated with Father Alexander.

In March 1955, Bishop Bogdan directed Father Dimitri and Father Hilarion
to begin mission work in Fort Worth, taking advantage of the weekends when
Father Alexander was in Dallas, in order to extend the benefits of the missionary
activity to a group of Orthodox residents of that city. Services were held in
the chapel of St. Andrew's Episcopal Church in downtown until the
summer of 1956. In order better to pursue its mission as an English-language parish and to
attract orthodox people of all national backgrounds, St. Seraphim's Church
decided to acquire property of its own. A house was bought at 4203 Newton
Avenue, and a chapel, meeting room, office and kitchen were arranged in the
house after considerable renovation. This building served the needs of the
parish until the new church was built in March and April 1961. The house
was then converted into a parish hall. In 1962, an adjacent lot with its house
were bought by the parish. The house is being renovated at present and will
eventually be used for a rectory. In September 1958 the parish was transferred from the jurisdiction of
Bishop Bogdan to that of Metropolitan Leonty, the Russian Metropolia.
Membership in St. Seraphim's parish has grown from the original 3 to
approximately 125 souls (in 1963). Average attendance at the Sunday Liturgy has increased
year by year and is now about 75 (in 1963). A Sunday School with two classes
is maintained (in 1963). Services are held regularly on Wednesday, Saturday, and Sunday
evenings, and the Liturgy is celebrated on Sundays and on holy days.”

Today
After the creation of Diocese of the South in July 1978 Saint Seraphim's was elevated from a parish to a cathedral with Bishop Dmitri as its rector and Diocesan Bishop. As of June 2021 the rector is Bishop Gerasim (Eliel) of Ft. Worth, who also serves as the Administrator of the Diocese.

Plans for a chapel and bell tower were in the works as of 2013, after a few set backs the chapel building is now complete. The chapel is attached to the southwest corner of the building and is named after the Resurrection. It is the resting place for Archbishop Dmitri, the founder of the Diocese.

Notes

External links
http://www.stseraphim.org/ - Official website
Virtual Tour:  http://orthodox360.com/tours/stseraphim-dallas/
Current Building: 
Newton Ave. Location (now the hall): 
Rectory:

References

Eastern Orthodox cathedrals in the United States
20th-century Eastern Orthodox church buildings
Orthodox Church in America cathedrals
Churches in Dallas
Churches completed in 1961
Christian organizations established in 1954
Eastern Orthodox churches in Texas